Parasaurus (meaning "near lizard") is a genus of pareiasaur known from fossils collected in the Kupferschiefer in Germany (Hesse, Thuringia and Lower Saxony), dating to the Late Permian (Wuchiapingian). The type species, Parasaurus geinitzi, described by Hermann von Meyer in 1857, was the first pareiasaur ever described. The seven known specimens were redescribed in 2008.

Discovery and naming
As early as 1848, pareiasaur fossils have been reported from Germany; some of these fossils may have belonged to Parasaurus. It was not until 1857 when von Meyer described these fossils and created the Parasaurus genus. von Meyer classified Parasaurus as a reptile but it was classified as a pareiasaur when the family was created in 1888. Lee (1997) classified Parasaurus as a nomen dubium. In 2008, Tsuji and Müller re-evaluated the genus.

Description 
Axial osteoderms appear to be absent. The skull surface is pitted, with small spike-like horns on the supratemporal and quadratojugal.

Phylogeny
Below is a cladogram from Tsuji et al. (2013):

Paleoenvironment 
The Kupferschiefer is a marine unit that forms part of the Zechstein, a sequence of rocks formed on the edge of the Zechstein Sea, a large inland shallow sea that existed in Northern Europe during the Late Permian. The environment at the time of deposition is considered to have been semi-arid. The terrestrial flora of the Zechstein is dominated by conifers, with seed ferns also being common, while taeniopterids, ginkgophytes and sphenophytes are rare. Other terrestrial vertebrates found in the Kupferschiefer and lower Zechstein include the gliding weigeltisaurid reptiles Weigeltisaurus and Glaurung, the archosauromorph reptile Protorosaurus, the cynodont Procynosuchus, and indeterminate captorhinids, dicynodonts, and dissorophid temnospondyls.

References 

Pareiasaurs
Nomina dubia
Fossil taxa described in 1857
Prehistoric reptile genera